Coffin Break was a hardcore punk band from Seattle, Washington.

History
Coffin Break was formed in Seattle in the late-1980s, at the start of the grunge era. The group released its first two full-length albums and a compilation on C/Z Records. Signing to Epitaph Records, they released two further albums in 1991 and 1992 before disbanding in late 1993. Both bassist Rob Skinner and guitarist Peter Litwin wrote songs for the group, and the group's releases show a marked difference between their songwriting styles. Kurt Cobain mentioned the group as one of his favorite bands. The band appeared in the 1996 documentary Hype!, directed by Doug Pray, with a short clip of a live version of their song Kill The President. Coffin Break reunited in 2007. They haven't released a new record since 1992.

Discography
Noise Patch b/w Boxes 'N Boxes/ Obsession Live EP (C/Z Records, 1988)
Psychosis (C/Z Records, 1989)
Rupture (C/Z Records, 1990)
No Sleep 'Til The Stardust Motel (compilation) (C/Z Records, 1991)
Crawl (Epitaph Records, 1991)
Thirteen (Epitaph Records, 1992)

Compilations
Another Damned Seattle Compilation (Dashboard Hula Girl Records, 1991)-"Love Song"
Teriyaki Asthma Vols. I-V (C/Z Records, 1991)-"Hole in the Ground"
Hard to Believe: Kiss Covers Compilation (C/Z Records, 1992)—"Beth"
More Songs About Anger, Fear, Sex & Death (Epitaph Records, 1992)—"For Beth" and "Crawl"

Members
David Brooks - drums
Peter Litwin - guitar, vocals
Rob Skinner - bass, vocals

References

C/Z Records artists
Epitaph Records artists
Hardcore punk groups from Washington (state)
Musical groups established in 1987
Musical groups disestablished in 1993
Musical groups from Seattle